Revolt is a 2013 album by the Japanese rock band Nothing's Carved in Stone released on June 26, 2013. The album peaked at 17 on the Oricon charts.

Track listing

References 

2013 albums
Epic Records albums
Sony Music Entertainment Japan albums